Substance Church is a nondenominational, Evangelical Christian, megachurch in Minneapolis–Saint Paul, Minnesota, United States.  In 2010, Outreach Magazine ranked the church as the 21st fastest growing congregation in the United States (8th in terms of growth percentages). Because the church has integrated ultra-contemporary worship, cell church, and cafe church methods into a singular megachurch setting, Substance is often cited as being "trend-setting".

History
The church was founded in 2004 by Pastor Peter Haas in partnership with the Association of Related Churches.  In May 2005, the church began holding Sunday services in the University of Minnesota on the Saint Paul campus.  In 2015 and 2016, after numerous re-locations, Substance acquired permanent facilities in Spring Lake Park and the Historic Wesley building in downtown Minneapolis.

Distinctives
Numerous publications have called it one of the most youthful megachurches in the country with over 70% of its members under 30 years old.  Substance is known for its ultra-contemporary approaches to worship utilizing turn-tables, rap, and other forms of media. They have produced dozens of music videos and album projects for their two nationally known worship bands, Substance Input-Output and their EDM DJ band, Substance Variant.  Their progressive approach to church methodology applies not only to their music but their use of videography in their multi-site church format and online social networking.

As a former dubstep DJ, its founding pastor, Peter Haas, is often cited in numerous books and publications for his conversion to Christianity in a nightclub.  Publications also often note Substance for its approaches towards Cell Church methodology and regular emphasis on church planting.

Beliefs
Substance Church adheres to classic Evangelicalism with some Neocharismatic overtones.  Although Substance does not officially classify itself as an emerging church, many articles find similarities, perhaps due to its youthful attendance. But despite their independent polity, Substance has assisted in the planting of numerous denominational and non-denominational churches ranging from Baptist to the Evangelical Covenant Church to Assemblies of God.

See also
 Multi-site church
 Cell Church
 Emerging Church
 Church Planting

References

External links
 Substance Church Home - http://substancechurch.com
 Substance Magazine - http://beingsubstance.com
 Star Tribune  "Rock of Younger Ages" Jeff Strickler -  http://www.startribune.com/lifestyle/faith/30269639.html
 Star Tribune "Growing Churches Blend the Old and the New"—HERÓN MÁRQUEZ ESTRADA  http://www.startribune.com/local/south/110453469.html
 www.peterhaas.org
 Association of Related Churches - http://www.arcchurches.com/

Evangelical megachurches in the United States
Evangelical churches in Minnesota